Ravenstruther Rail Terminal is a freight handling facility near Ravenstruther in Scotland.

History 
The terminal was formerly operated by Scottish Coal. The coal loading facilities have since been demolished.

In 2020, the site was leased by owner Hargreaves Land to Cloburn Quarry Company. In October 2021, Cloburn acquired the site outright.

Protests 
During operation, the terminal was the site of regular protests.

References

External links
RailScot

Rail yards in the United Kingdom
Transport in South Lanarkshire